Girmitiyas, also known as Jahajis, were indentured laborers from British India transported to work on plantations in Fiji, Mauritius, South Africa, and the Caribbean (mostly Trinidad and Tobago, Guyana, and Suriname) as part of the Indian indenture system.

Etymology 

The word girmit represented an Indian pronunciation of the English language word "agreement" - from the indenture "agreement" of the British Government with Indian labourers.  The agreements specified the workers' length of stay in foreign parts and the conditions attached to their return to the British Raj. The word Jahāj refers to 'ship' in Indic languages (from the Arabic/Persian Jahāz/جهاز), with Jahaji implying 'people of ship' or 'people coming via ship'.

In Fiji, Governor Arthur Hamilton-Gordon discouraged Melanesian Fijians from working on the plantations in an attempt to preserve their culture. Activist Shaneel Lal argues that Girmitiya were deceitfully enslaved by the British.

See also 
 Indian indenture system
Indo-Caribbeans
Indians in Fiji
Fiji Hindi
 Fijian Indian diaspora
 Global Girmit Museum

References

Further reading
 
 
 
 Gaiutra Bahadur (2014). Coolie Woman: The Odyssey of Indenture. The University of Chicago. 

Praveen Kumar Jha (2019). Coolie Lines. New Delhi: Vani Prakashan.

External links 
 South Asian Indentured Labor - Online Archive of Research and Resources - an online archive and living syllabus of text-based resources related to Indian indentureship, with country-specific resources and material related to global Indian indenture diasporas
 Interview of Mahendra Chaudhry about Girmitiyas in FIji

Fijian people of Indian descent
Indentured servitude